The Eurovision Young Dancers 1985 was the first edition of the Eurovision Young Dancers, held at Teatro Municipale in Reggio Emilia, Italy on 16 June 1985. Organised by the European Broadcasting Union (EBU) and host broadcaster Radiotelevisione Italiana (RAI), dancers from eleven countries participated in the televised final.

Arantxa Argüelles of Spain won the contest, with Norway and Sweden placing second and third respectively.

Location

Teatro Municipale (also since the 1980s called the Teatro Municipale Valli due to being named after the actor Romolo Valli), a theatre in Reggio Emilia, Northern Italy was the host venue for the 1985 edition of the Eurovision Young Dancers.

Following the destruction by fire of the 1741 Teatro Cittadella in April 1851, the new theatre was designed by the architect Cesare Costa and constructed in the neoclassic style between 1852 and 1857. Its inauguration took place on 21 April 1857 with the performance of the Vittor Pisani by local composer Achille Peri.

Format
The format consists of dancers who are non-professional and between the ages of 16–21, competing in a performance of dance routines of their choice, which they have prepared in advance of the competition. All of the acts then take part in a choreographed group dance during 'Young Dancers Week'.

Jury members of a professional aspect and representing the elements of ballet, contemporary, and modern dancing styles, score each of the competing individual and group dance routines. The overall winner upon completion of the final dances is chosen by the professional jury members.

The interval act was a ballet performance from presenters repertoire.

Results

Final
Awards were given to the top three countries. The table below highlights these using gold, silver, and bronze. The placing results of the remaining participants is unknown and never made public by the European Broadcasting Union.

Jury members
The jury members consisted of the following:
 – Peter Schaufuss (chairman)
 – Alicia Markova
 – Paolo Bortoluzzi
/ — Marika Besobrasova
 – Helba Nogueira

Broadcasting
The 1985 Young Dancers competition was broadcast in at least 11 countries.

See also
 European Broadcasting Union
 Eurovision Song Contest 1985
 Eurovision Young Dancers

Notes and references

Notes

References

External links 
 

Eurovision Young Dancers by year
1985 in Italy
June 1985 events in Europe
Historical events in Italy